Alfred H. Grebe pronounced Gree-bee (1895-October 24, 1935) was a pioneer in the radio broadcasting field.

He was born in Richmond Hill in the borough of Queens, in New York City. At the age of 9 he was given a radio set by his father, and soon came to be such an expert that his science teacher at Public School 88 in Jamaica said Alfred knew more than he did. From public school, he went to a training school in Jamaica, and a commercial radio school in Manhattan, New York City, where he conducted his own experiments. By age 15, he became a licensed commercial operator, and went to work as a ship's radio operator. After three years onboard (during which time he traveled as far as India) he returned to Long Island, where the first commercial station on the island was being built at Sayville. He got a job as an operator there. Later, because there was currently a radio craze, some friends had him make receivers for them. After making a few sets, he decided to go into commercial production.

In 1914 he issued his first catalog, and set up a factory in Richmond Hill on the same property where his home was located, which soon became able to produce all the components needed to assemble a radio, and which contained research laboratories as well. By 1922 he tore down his home to build a larger factory on the site.

To stimulate public interest, he set up several radio stations: one (WAHG) was identified with his own initials; another (WBOQ) had call letters standing for Borough of Queens. (His WAHG is, through several call letter changes, now WCBS, still a major radio station in New York City.) He set up a broadcasting company called the "Atlantic Broadcasting Corporation" (changing WAHG to WABC on November 1,  1926) which operated his stations until he sold them to CBS in January 1929. (A different WABC was later formed as the flagship station for the eponymous "American Broadcasting Company".)

Grebe's publicity manager, Bill Schudt, Jr., stayed with CBS after the sale of WABC. When television station W2XAB began experiments in 1931, Schudt became CBS' first television director. He retired from the network in 1966 as director of affiliate relations.

Alfred Grebe's manufacturing company, A. H. Grebe and Co. Inc., was renamed Grebe Radio and Television Corporation and moved from Richmond Hill to Manhattan in 1933.

In 1935 Grebe underwent a stomach operation at Post-Graduate Hospital in Manhattan. He became ill after the operation and died after 10 days.

In 2017, Grebe was honored as "The Father of NewsRadio880" during a series commemorating the 50th anniversary of WCBS going all news.

References

External links
Two obituaries for Alfred Grebe 

1895 births
1935 deaths
Radio pioneers
People from Richmond Hill, Queens